Ence may refer to:

 Ence (company), a Spanish multinational company
 Ence (esports), a Finnish esports organization